Ulagansky District (Ulagan aymak) is an administrative and municipal district (raion), one of the ten in the Altai Republic, Russia. It is located in the east of the republic and borders Turochaksky District, Choysky District, Ongudaysky District, and Kosh-Agachsky District, as well as the republics of Tuva and Khakassia. Its administrative center is the rural locality (a selo) of Ulagan. As of the 2010 Census, the total population of the district was 11,388, with the population of Ulagan accounting for 28.3% of that number. Altai make up 57.2% of the district's population, followed by Russians (20.2%), Telengits (16.3%), Kazakhs (4.5%) and Uzbeks (1.8%).

Geography
The district is located in a mountainous area, away from major roads. A large part of the district along the mountainous eastern border is in the Altai Nature Reserve. The mountainous topography of the region, like the rest of the Altai Mountains, was created by tectonic movements of the Paleozoic age, more than 300-600 million years ago.

History
The district was established on October 19, 1923 within Oirot Autonomous Oblast.

Administrative and municipal status
Within the framework of administrative divisions, Ulagansky District is one of the ten in the Altai Republic. As a municipal division, the district is incorporated as Ulagansky Municipal District. Both administrative and municipal districts are divided into the same seven rural settlements, comprising thirteen rural localities. The selo of Ulagan serves as the administrative center of both the administrative and municipal district.

References

Notes

Sources

Исполнительный комитет Алтайского краевого Совета народных депутатов. Архивный отдел. Государственный архив Алтайского края. "Справочник административно-территориальных изменений на Алтае, 1917–1980" (Reference Book of the Administrative-Territorial Changes in Altai, 1917–1980). Барнаул, Алтайское книжное издательство, 1987.

Districts of the Altai Republic
States and territories established in 1923